Henry Matthew Stowell (1859–1944), also known by the pen-name Hare Hongi, was a New Zealand language interpreter and genealogist of European and Māori descent. 

He was born in Waimate North, Northland, New Zealand in 1859. His father was John Shephard Stowell, a sawyer who had come from the United States. His mother was Hūhana (Susan) Farley, daughter of Matthew Farley and Rīmaumau (Maumau), a high-born woman of the Ngāpuhi iwi. He attended schools in Auckland. In his teens he spent over a year at Waitaha village, near Ahipara, where he learned Māori lore from Ngā Kuku Mumu, a tohunga. He went to live at Waiwhetū, in the Hutt Valley, and became an authorised Māori–English interpreter  in the Native Land Court in 1888. In 1891 he married Mary Rachel Robson, the daughter of James Robson, a sawmiller, and Mere Ngāmai, also known as Mary Harrison. He collected Māori lore and legends from informants and had articles published under the name Hare Hongi. He authored the Māori–English Tutor and Vade Mecum, published in 1913.

References

1859 births
1944 deaths
Interpreters
New Zealand genealogists
Ngāpuhi people